Mark McCutcheon (born May 21, 1984 in Ithaca, New York) is an American former professional ice hockey player. Mark is the son of former Buffalo Sabres Associate Coach and former NHL player Brian McCutcheon.

Playing career
McCutcheon was drafted 146th overall in the 2003 NHL Entry Draft by the Colorado Avalanche. Mark played collegiate hockey with Cornell University for four years before he made his professional debut in the 2007–08 season with Avalanche affiliate, the Lake Erie Monsters of the AHL. After two seasons with the Monsters, Mark left as a free agent leading the Monsters in games played by a forward with 128.

On October 9, 2009, Mark signed with the Idaho Steelheads of the ECHL for the 2009–10 season. McCutcheon played 3 games with the Steelheads, including scoring the first goal of the season for Idaho, before he was loaned to the Portland Pirates of the AHL on October 23, 2009. Despite scoring two goals in five games Mark was released from the Pirates. However before returning to the Steelheads he was signed by fellow AHL team, the Manitoba Moose, on November 3, 2009. Going scoreless in 12 games with the Moose, he was reunited with the Steelheads, posting 18 points in 15 post-season games to advance to the Kelly Cup finals before defeat to the Cincinnati Cyclones.

On August 2, 2010, Mark left North America and signed a one-year contract with Norwegian team Vålerenga of the GET-ligaen. Emerging as one of the league's best with 23 points in 16 games, Mark was noticed by German DEL team, DEG Metro Stars, and was offered an immediate one-year contract with the consent of Vålerenga on November 15, 2010.

Unable to replicate his success with the Metro Stars, McCutcheon left at season's conclusion and signed a contract with Italian Serie A club, HC Bolzano, on August 29, 2011. In his second season with Bolzano in 2012–13, McCutcheon led the team and finished 5th in league scoring with 60 points in 44 games.

On May 22, 2013, McCutcheon signed as a free agent to a one-year contract with no out clause in returning to former Norwegian club Vålerenga.

After a brief stint with Danish club, Aalborg Pirates of the Metal Ligaen, McCutcheon continued his journeyman career in signing a one-year contract with Northern Irish club, Belfast Giants of the EIHL on August 5, 2014.

Career statistics

References

External links

1984 births
Aalborg Pirates players
American men's ice hockey centers
Belfast Giants players
Bolzano HC players
Cornell Big Red men's ice hockey players
Colorado Avalanche draft picks
DEG Metro Stars players
Idaho Steelheads (ECHL) players
Lake Erie Monsters players
Living people
Manitoba Moose players
Portland Pirates players
Vålerenga Ishockey players
Ice hockey players from New York (state)
American sportspeople of Canadian descent
American expatriate ice hockey players in Canada
American expatriate ice hockey players in Northern Ireland
American expatriate ice hockey players in Norway
American expatriate ice hockey players in Germany
American expatriate ice hockey players in Italy
American expatriate ice hockey players in Denmark